is a Japanese composer and arranger best known for his work for anime and video games. He was affiliated with the music production company MONACA, but left in 2021 to be freelance.

Biography 
Tanaka was born in Osaka. He first became interested in music as a young child when he saw his older sisters playing piano. Soon after, he began taking piano lessons. He became dispassionate toward traditional lessons, however, and practiced with an electronic keyboard at home. While in junior high school, Tanaka learned to play acoustic guitar after being inspired by folk-rock duo Yuzu. As he learned how to play songs by Yuzu, he realized that he wanted to make his own music. Soon after, he began learning how to use MIDI software on his computer. His first experience was using Yamaha's Easy Composition Master software to convert melodies he hummed into MIDI.

Tanaka graduated from Kobe University in the Department of Human Development, where he studied musical composition under the guidance of Professor Yu Wakao. Shortly after graduating, Tanaka was recruited on Mixi by composer Satoru Kōsaki as an assistant at his production company MONACA. Tanaka officially joined the company in 2010. At first, he would often accompany Kōsaki to recording sessions and assist with music preparation and Pro Tools operation. Soon after, he would begin writing and producing his own music. As an employee of MONACA, he wrote theme songs and background music for many anime series including The Idolmaster, Nyaruko: Crawling with Love, Aikatsu! and Wake Up, Girls!. He has also written music for video games and for recording artists. On July 31, 2021, after 10 years with the company, he left MONACA and to work as a freelancer.

Tanaka is noted for frequently using a specific augmented sixth chord in his works. This chord has been nicknamed the "Blackadder chord" by music theorist Joshua Taipale.

On October 24, 2022, he was arrested on suspicion of sexual assault of a teenage girl in Meguro, Tokyo in August of that year. He was sentenced to prison behind bars. His name has been removed from various anime series, the sales for the 2nd opening theme to Uzaki-chan Wants to Hang Out! were halted, and the sales of the 4th version of the 1st opening theme to Pokémon Ultimate Journeys: The Series were halted as well. On March 15, 2023, Tanaka admitted to obscenity charges which included saying obscene language to a 15-year-old girl.

Discography

Anime soundtracks

Video game soundtracks

Television drama soundtracks

Anime theme songs

Video game songs

Other songs

Albums

References

External links

 
 Discography at VGMdb
 Hidekazu Tanaka profile at Oricon 
 
 

1987 births
Anime composers
Japanese composers
Japanese film score composers
Japanese male composers
Japanese male film score composers
Japanese music arrangers
Kobe University alumni
Living people
Musicians from Osaka
Video game composers